The Galadima of Katsina is a chieftaincy title in the emirates of Katsina State, northern Nigeria.

The Galadima of Katsina State, Justice Nasir Mamman died on April 13, 2019, GCON.

References

Royal titles
Noble titles